Aarani Mantalu is a Telugu film starring Chiranjeevi and Kavitha. It was the first Chiranjeevi film to be dubbed to Tamil. In the Tamil dubbed version, editor Mohan dubbed for Chiranjeevi, the well known producer and father of Tamil director Mohan Raja and Actor Jayam Ravi.

Plot
Ravi's (Chiranjeevi) sister Sarada (Subhashini) is raped and murdered by a gang of four, who is acquitted. Ravi gets revenge on the four rapists by killing each of them, but he finds each of them dead beforehand.

Cast
 Chiranjeevi as Ravi
 Kavitha as Latha
 Prasad Babu as Inspector Raghu
 Subhashini as Sarada
 Hari Babu
 Ceylon Manohar as David
 Navakanth
 Jayamalini
 Giri Babu as Giri
 Raavi Kondala Rao as Latha's father
 Rallapalli as constable
 R. Narayana Murthy as rowdy

References

External links
 

1980 films
Films scored by Satyam (composer)
1980s Telugu-language films